John Joseph "Count" O'Donovan (1889 - 28 April 1920) was an Irish Gaelic footballer who played as a midfielder for the Cork senior team.

Born in Clonakilty, County Cork, O'Donovan first arrived on the inter-county scene at the age of twenty-two when he first linked up with the Cork senior team. He made his senior debut in the 1911 championship. O'Donovan went on to play a key part for Cork during a successful period, and won one All-Ireland medal.

At club level O'Donovan was a one-time senior championship medallist with Lees. He also won one intermediate championship medal with Clonakilty.

Throughout his inter-county career, O'Donovan made 9 championship appearances for Cork. His retirement came following the conclusion of the 1916 championship.

Honours

Team

Lees
Cork Senior Football Championship (1): 1911

Clonakilty
Cork Intermediate Football Championship (1): 1913 (c)

Cork
All-Ireland Senior Football Championship (1): 1911

References

1889 births
1920 deaths
Lees Gaelic footballers
Clonakilty Gaelic footballers
Cork inter-county Gaelic footballers
Winners of one All-Ireland medal (Gaelic football)